Shergill is a clan (gotra) of Jats, its parent clan is Gill. According to oral history, the founding progenitor of the clan was a man named Shergill, who was the son of Gill. The Majithia family belong to this clan.

Notable people bearing the name Shergill (or Sher-Gill), and who may or may not be related to the clan, include:
 Avneet Shergill, U.S. soccer player
 Amrita Sher-Gil, Indian painter
 Daljit Singh Shergill, U.K. Sikh leader
 Dyal Singh Majithia founder of The Tribune and Punjab National Bank
 Jaiveer Shergill, Indian politician and lawyer
 Jimmy Shergill, Indian actor and producer
 Lehna Singh Majithia, Sikh polymath and father of Dyal Singh
 Rabbi Shergill, Indian musician
 Rubina Shergill, Indian actress

See also
 Gill (name)

References